Felix Manuel Valera Alvarez (born 19 January 1988) is a Dominican professional boxer who held the WBA interim light-heavyweight title from 2015 to 2016. As an amateur Valera won a silver medal at the 2010 Central American and Caribbean Games in the middleweight weight category.

Professional career
Valera won the interim WBA light-heavyweight title on August 23, 2015, defeating Stanyslav Kashtanov by split decision.

Professional boxing record

References

External links
 

1988 births
Living people
Dominican Republic male boxers
Central American and Caribbean Games silver medalists for the Dominican Republic
Competitors at the 2010 Central American and Caribbean Games
Light-heavyweight boxers
Central American and Caribbean Games medalists in boxing